The following is a list of characters from the series The Awesomes.

The Awesomes

Professor Dr. Jeremy "Prock" Awesome
Professor Dr. Jeremy "Prock" Awesome (voiced by Seth Meyers) - The son of Mr. Awesome. Jeremy Awesome is the young new leader of the Awesomes.  Known as Prock (a portmanteau of Professor and Doctor, since Prock has a JD and an MD) he has always wanted to be a superhero like his father, Mr. Awesome. Prock disappointingly doesn't have any of his father's impressive physical powers: indeed, he is unimposing and injury-prone. However, he's the smartest on the team and a natural leader: in a crisis he comes up with excellent plans and assigns jobs to everyone on the team. For some reason, Prock has so far chosen to keep his other powers hidden from his teammates, likely because they may want to use it for personal gain: he has low-level chronokinesis i.e. can stop time for ten-second increments (he can stop it for longer, but he revealed in "Euro-Awesomes" that doing so really hurts, often in the form of nosebleeds or cranial trauma), and he is also immune to mind control as his father was. Prock lied to his father that he no longer uses his time power, as doctors told him continuing to use it would kill him. His blind spot is that he has a huge crush on Hotwire, which is why she's on the team and it sometimes gets in the way. Prock wears a blue jumpsuit with a black utility belt and has a golden "A" on his chest similar to his father.

Harry "Muscleman" Strong
Harry "Muscleman" Strong (voiced by Ike Barinholtz) - Prock's best friend from childhood since their fathers were teammates in the original Awesomes. He inherited his superhero name - along with superhuman strength (up to two thousand tons with effort) and invulnerability - from his father and grandfather before him. Muscleman likes to stay on the positive side of everything, which can get a little annoying. He wears a red singlet with black tights and black cuffs and also has an extremely large amount of chest hair. It was revealed in a season 2 episode that he is Jewish. In the first episode of season 3 it is revealed that although he lacks intellect, he has a natural talent for picking up foreign languages.  He was able to fluently talk to dolphins just by spending a couple of hours with one.

Connie "Concierge"
Connie "Concierge" (voiced by Emily Spivey) - The secretary of the new Awesomes, who helped Prock and Muscleman recruit the others (mostly from an old reject pile). While not seen by the others as a superhero, she is very intelligent and organized.  Concierge is present on most missions, often seen with a tablet computer, filling in with needed resources that others often lack. Concierge ended up with the job only because she was the last of the old staff to say "Not it," though now she likes it. In the episode People vs Perfect Man, she officially becomes a superhero and member of the Awesomes.

Zip "Frantic" Danger
Zip "Frantic" Danger (voiced by Taran Killam) - His power is superhuman speed. It's said that he's the third fastest in the world and he can run 500 miles an hour. It's currently unknown how he acquired his powers, but his parents, who run a circus in the southern United States and are verbally and psychologically abusive towards Frantic, think he's a failure since his abilities have little use in their work. He's hyperactive (to the point that he was rejected by the Awesomes during Mr. Awesome's tenure as leader for that reason) and in a hurry to do the right thing. He looks up to Prock. His quirky personality often butts heads with the other members, as he often desires attention and fame. His standardized superpower level is 7. He wears yellow and white tights that resemble lightning. It was also revealed in "The Awesomes' Awesome Show," that he is gay.

Arlene "Gadget Gal"
Arlene "Gadget Gal" (voiced by Paula Pell) - The only active original member of The Awesomes. She aged and decided to retire, but Prock convinced her to return when a rejuvenation ray made her 25 again. Her superpower is her reflexes and physical prowess, often with improvised objects from her purse; Gadget Gal can turn anything within her grasp into a weapon. She is also known for her frequent 1940s anachronisms and her unintended racial or sexual slurs. In the Season 3 episode 'Villain-Tine's Day' her first name is revealed to be Arlene.

Austin "Impresario" Sullivan
Austin "Impresario" Sullivan (voiced by Kenan Thompson) - A "mama's boy" whose power is the conjuring of anything he can imagine using a mysterious jewel he found in the woods. Unfortunately, everything he conjures has his mother's face and voice; this was the reason he was once rejected by the Awesomes. He wears a purple and pink tuxedo and a jeweled turban. In the episode, "Baby Got Backstory" his mother reveals that his powers don't come from his gem and that she lied to him to help him realize his potential and that the gem is actually one of her earrings. In the episode "Made Man" he became able to create constructs without his mom's face. The removal of this limitation, combined with his standardized superpower level of 8 (superheroes of level 8 and up being scarce), has made him one of the most powerful superheroes in the world. But, at the end of the episode, he catches his mother having sex with Made Man, causing his constructs to have his mother's face and voice again. His credit card, much to his chagrin, is constantly used by other people.....

Tim 'Timothy' "Sumo"
Tim 'Timothy' "Sumo" (voiced by Bobby Lee) - Initially known only by his first name, he's only 11 years old but extremely powerful; he was only rejected earlier because of his age. In a manner similar to The Incredible Hulk, he can transform into a sumo wrestler when injured or angered, and in this form he appears to be even stronger than Muscleman. His standardized superpower level is 9, making him even more powerful than Impresario. Tim wears no costume. His Sumo form is the embodiment of his rage, it is established in 'Robo-Therapy' that if he works out his anger issues, the best he can do is a mildly dissatisfied Japanese man. His parents are in hiding from their past conflicts from the villain group, the IT Department, and have entrusted The Awesomes with Tim's care. He is part Korean from his mother and part Japanese from his father.

Katherine "Hotwire" Malocchio
Katherine "Hotwire" Malocchio (voiced by Rashida Jones) - Her power is manipulating electricity, hence her superhero name. It is unknown to the rest of the team when she first joins, but she is Dr. Malocchio's daughter, who was the one who had her try out in the first place. It is revealed in the second season that she and her brother, Giuseppe Malocchio Jr., enjoyed an especially close relationship when they were younger. Concierge doesn't trust her at first because she cannot find anything about her background. Prock is oblivious to these concerns because of his almost childish crush on her. Hotwire is revealed to already be dating Perfect Man when she is introduced on the show in the second episode. Despite this, he seems to know very little about her, including the fact that she has an engineering degree from MIT. After faking her own death at the end of season one, she returned in season two wearing an armored battle suit of her own design and manufacturing (similar to Iron Man), powered by her own electrical output, and fighting crime under the alias Metal Fella. The name, the design of the suit, and a manipulated voice lead everyone to believe that Metal Fella is a man. In "Euro-Awesomes," she revealed her true identity and rejoined the Awesomes. In season three, she has a different appearance with her hair much shorter and wears pink gauntlets and rocket boots that are similar to the ones on her Metal Fella suit. As of season three, Prock and Hotwire are dating and in the episode "The Dames of Danger" she is revealed to be pregnant. In the season three finale, she and Prock are shown at the end of the episode holding their infant daughter who bears a resemblance to Hotwire but with Prock's eye colour.

Perfect Man Awesome
Perfect Man Awesome (voiced by Josh Meyers) - Arrogant, publicity-seeking but lovable Perfect Man is a former member of the original Awesomes, who has gone solo. At the beginning of the series, he's dating Hotwire although he considers it a casual relationship. Perfect Man can fly and has telescopic vision and x-ray vision. He has awesome hair and an extremely muscular physique. He wears red tights with a gold cape and a  cursive "P" on his chest. Dr. Malocchio has hypnotized him not to interfere with the Awesomes or Hotwire's involvement with them. His personality is similar to Booster Gold's when he first appeared in the DC Universe.  When he is convicted of high treason, he is imprisoned. After being rescued by The Awesomes, he hides in Awesome Mountain for most of the second season until his name is cleared. As of season three, he's officially a member of The Awesomes, first under Prock, then as Mr. Awesomes' reformed team when they retake Awesome Mountain. In "The Gayfather", it is revealed that he is in fact Mr. Awesomes illegitimate son, thus making him and Prock half-brothers. His mind was wiped of his past by Dr. Turfenpeltz to ensure this information of his father and mother stays secret. In the season 3 finale, he starts dating Silent But Deadly after he found that she is actually a woman. Unlike his father and half-brother, he doesn't have immunity to mind control.

Supervillains

Dr. Giuseppe Malocchio
Dr. Giuseppe Malocchio (voiced by Bill Hader) - Founder of Malocchio Laboratories in the 1940s, he was the first doctor to study superheroes and was the confidante of many of the world's leading heroes in his quest to understand and isolate the super-gene. Among his partnerships were the original 1940s lineup of The Awesomes, and Mr. Awesome soon became his best friend. Together they worked in the laboratory and co-discovered the super-gene. But Malocchio and Mr. Awesome had different ideas as to how best use their new discovery. Malocchio wanted to use it to make ordinary humans super, and injected himself with the serum. Although originally good, the terrible side effects of the formula turned him monstrously evil. He gained the ability to control human or superhero minds at will. He then used the serum to create an evil army of super-villains, who have battled superheroes for decades, each villain identifiable as one of Malocchio's by the characteristic red eyes; Malocchio means 'evil eye' in Italian. Considered the world's most dangerous super-villain, he was imprisoned. Once the original Awesomes disbanded, he easily escaped from prison by using his mind control on the guards, and even forced them to become his minions.  His goal is to convince everyone to surrender their superpowers, ostensibly to protect bystanders from collateral damage. He has a passion for gourmet cooking and is Hotwire's father.  Dr. Malocchio is believed to be deceased but is actually living in a secret base with Mr. Awesome, who is attempting to find the cure for the evil super-gene formula. In the season two finale, thanks to the blood transfusion from Mr. Awesome he finally becomes good again but a mishap in the lab resulted in his evil-genes entering into Mr. Awesome's bloodstream making him evil as a result. He agreed to return to Earth to warn the Awesomes about what happened, but was locked out of the escape capsule when he stepped outside to urinate and it drifted away. Suffering from oxygen deprivation and severely amnesiac, Malocchio was rescued by a troupe of space hippies in a psychedelically-painted craft. Unable to recall his mission or even his own name, yet still possessing his culinary skills, he agreed to be the band's chef. But thanks to Perfect Man reminding him who he is by telling he used to sleep with his daughter and saying the word awesome jogged his memory and remembered everything and his mission, he decides to return to earth once more to stop Mr. Awesome's diabolical plan to destroy all of humanity before it is too late. In the episode "The Gayfather" he finally returns to Earth and warns the Awesomes about Mr. Awesome being evil and happy also knowing he is going be a grandfather when his daughter is pregnant, much to her and the team's shock to see he is alive.

Whiskey 'Richard' Dick
Whiskey 'Richard' Dick (voiced by Taran Killam) - Appeared in the episode "Euro-Awesomes" to steal high tech parts from three different labs (one in America and two in Europe) but was killed shortly after revealing that he had been hired to do so (it turned out to be Prock's old mentor Dr. Turfenpeltz). He has the power to render anyone (even robots) drunk so long as they're within a certain range.

Dr. Turfenpeltz
Dr. Turfenpeltz (voiced by Bobby Moynihan) - He was formerly the chief scientist for the Awesomes and was Prock's mentor and helped Prock to believe in himself and his intellect, after leaving the Awesomes he went to work at a high tech lab. After it was revealed that he had hired Wiskey Dick to steal a high tech part (including one from his own lab) and had tricked both the Awesomes and Euro-Awesomes into gathering in one place, he used a giant robot to start replicating their powers, when he found out that Prock had another power beside his intellect he replicated it and called Prock a fool for never using it, declaring the power to stop time to be the greatest of them all. He ended up defeating himself by stopping time for too long (not knowing that you shouldn't do it for more than 10 seconds). It is shown from Dr. Turfenpeltz's process of weakening that stopping time can cause what appears to be brain hemorrhaging as blood leaks from his ears and eyes.

Tomboy
Tomboy (voiced by Rachel Dratch) - Female arch-enemy of Gadget Gal, she has battled her for decades and also uses gadgets. In the first episode she—along with Gadget Gal—is affected by a rejuvenation ray that reverses aging. Later during a partially off-screen confrontation, she reveals she is a lesbian and sexually attracted to Gadget Gal but fought her as an enemy for decades as an awkward way of avoiding having to deal with her feelings.

The Animal Kingdom
The Animal Kingdom - A group of 5 adorable anthropomorphic animals, they're actually violent and foul mouthed villains with greater strength than their small size suggests.

Seaman
Seaman (voiced by Andy Samberg) - An ocean-themed superhero turned supervillain who resides in the ocean after leaving the Awesomes due to a conflict with Mr. Awesome. He has a habit of making fish puns, much to the annoyance of Gadget Gal, who pronounces his name as "Semen." He became evil out of frustration that ocean life gets no respect and captured the Awesomes to use them as sideshow attractions similar to that of SeaWorld, dubbed LandWorld.

Villain-Tine
Villain-Tine (voiced by Jack McBrayer) - A supervillain who usually invades every Valentine's Day to steal the world's roses in order to sell them for high prices.

The Gay Mafia
The Gay Mafia - The world's first openly gay supervillain mafia team, led by the GayFather, who blackmail closeted homosexual celebrities for money in addition to counterfeiting antiques. Their plan was to release a radioactive substance into the city's water supply to induce every gay person to come out of the closet, until Frantic and the Awesomes managed to prevent it. One of the villains, Christopher, starts dating Frantic at the beginning of the episode. However, Christopher ended up agreeing with Frantic that gay people should be able to come out of the closet without being forced, knocks out his boss and betrays the Gay Mafia.

The Astoundings
A villainous super-team on Earth-4, also known as Opposite Earth, and are the evil counterparts of the Awesomes.

Professor Astounding
Professor Astounding (voiced by Seth Meyers) - Prock's evil counterpart and leader of the Astoundings. He doesn't appear to have any of Prock's powers, but wears a giant exo-suit that gives him super-strength, shoot laser blasts, control and fire electrical blasts, and flight and is just as intelligent as Prock. He also has greased hair with a blonde streak and speaks with 90s slang. He's revealed to be eviller than his father, Mr. Astounding, the evil counterpart of Mr. Awesome and had a loving relationship with him, the opposite of Prock's relationship with his father.

The Beast
The Beast - Muscle Man's evil counterpart, but is a giant evil bulldog. He has the same hairstyle as Muscle Man, but is a brown-furred bulldog with sharp fangs and wears a black and red spiked collar.

Infobitch
Infobitch (voiced by Emily Spivey) - Concierge's evil counterpart, who has spiky blond hair and wears big oval-shaped sunglasses, a green fur coat and black high-heeled boots and wields 2 machine guns. According to Concierge, she looks "whorish," but also has style.

Kid Meth
Kid Meth (voiced by Taran Killam) - Frantic's evil counterpart, who has super-speed as well, but also has green pyrokinetic powers. He has black hair, with a pink streak and wears a spiked collar and a skull T-shirt with the sleeves ripped off. He also wears a silver belt, blue gloves, blue pants, and blue boots. Like Frantic, he's also hyperactive and wears yellow goggles. Unlike Frantic, when he runs, he leaves a purple and green vapor trail, as opposed to Frantic's yellow and white vapor trails.

Mercenary Moll
Mercenary Moll (voiced by Paula Pell) - Gadget Gal's evil counterpart, who has a spiked hairdo and wears a black jumpsuit with black straps and a yellow and red M emblem, red gloves, red boots, and a yellow utility belt. Unlike Gadget Gal, she wields laser and net guns. Like Gadget Gal, she talks 40s slang.

The Conjurer
The Conjurer (voiced by Kenan Thompson) - Impresario's evil counterpart, who can also conjure up anything he imagines, but his conjurings are red and don't have his mom's face or voice, unlike the real Impresario. He wears a purple helmet with a purple visor, purple gloves, purple boots, a purple singlet, and a purple cape. Like Impresario, he wears the feather and gem on his helmet.

Bad Dragon
Bad Dragon (voiced by Bobby Lee) - Sumo's evil counterpart, who has the ability to transform into a sumo dragon with green scales, wings, and a tail. Unlike Sumo, he can breathe fire and can fly. His skin is green with a green dragon symbol on his chest and green horns on his head.

Other Hotwire
Other Hotwire (voiced by Rashida Jones) - Hotwire's supposedly evil counterpart, who is the most similar to her good counterpart. Other Hotwire was used by Professor Astounding for electrical purposes and had even caused her to become incredibly weak, so he kidnapped Hotwire to replace her. However, Other Hotwire betrayed him and assisted Hotwire in defeating him. She has strawberry blonde hair and wears a blue version of Hotwire's uniform. While the real Hotwire's electricity is blue, Other Hotwire's electricity is pink. Due to constant use of the super weapon, she was drained to the point of death. She uses her last bit of her electricity to help Hotwire before dying.

The P.R.I.C.K.S.
A super villain team formed by Malocchio Jr and Elliot Levy-Apelstien for the sole purpose of destroying the Awesomes during the episode 'Tim Goes to School' and since then they have been getting a new member every episode i.e. the main villain of that episode. The acronym stands for Primates Really Into Crime and Killing Sprees.

Giuseppe Malocchio Jr.
Giuseppe Malocchio Jr. (voiced by Will Forte) - The son of renowned supervillain Dr. Malocchio, Jr. was just an accountant. However, after his father "dies", he inherits a vial of the very serum that turned his father evil. He decides to use the serum on himself, giving him the power of supersonic screams. After this, he decides to commit his life to destroy the Awesomes. In the season 3 finale, he was released from prison thanks to Prock and his family. He is happy knowing his father is alive and became good for while, even though the serum kicked back in and became evil again; he still loves his family and they are enjoying their new lives in Italy since he and his father have been banned from the United States for their crimes.

Elliot "Jeff Apelstein" Levy-Apelstein
Elliot "Jeff Apelstein" Levy-Apelstein (voiced by Colin Quinn) - A talking ape-man from Apesylvania and an acquaintance of Malocchio Jr.; the use of the word "Primates" in the team's name is presumably due to his membership. Apelstein has an intense hatred for humans and plotted to kill his nephew and his fiancée Abby Strong, Muscleman's sister, to prevent them from getting married as well as kill the Awesomes, guests at the wedding, as part of a deal he made with Malocchio Jr. After the plot is foiled by the Awesomes, Jr. injects him with his father's serum and he gains elastic powers.

Pablo
Pablo (voiced by Bobby Moynihan) - A bully from Tim/Sumo's school who became a member of the P.R.I.C.K.S. after he impressed them by driving Sumo into such a rage that he destroyed the local school and turned against his own team. His powers are geokinesis.

Lola "The Agravator" Gold
Lola "The Agravator" Gold (voiced by Kate McKinnon) - A supervillain with the power to turn people against each other. She used to drive bank tellers crazy so she could rob their banks while they were arguing. That is until she realized there was more money in reality TV, sometime after this she talked the Awesomes into letting her produce their own show and after a while turned them against each other purely for ratings. When she uses her superpowers, she removes her sunglasses revealing she has black and grey eyes and her brain becomes quite visible. She is defeated when Prock convinces a group of actors known as "The Fishsticks" who wanted their own show to kidnap her, after she is saved by the P.R.I.C.K.S. she joins them.

Impresario Clone
Impresario Clone (also voiced by Kenan Thompson) - An exact construct copy of Impresario except for a small lump of Impresario's mom and Made Man having sex on his shoulder that he covers with a scarf. Was originally one of many Impresario clones until the original saw his mom and Made Man having sex which triggered a psychological reaction that made the image appear on all of Impresario's constructs which all of the clones saw appear on them which made all but one commit suicide from sheer horror, the last one is determined to destroy Impresario and the rest of the Awesomes for trying to destroy him and forever leaving the lump on his shoulder and thus joined the P.R.I.C.K.S.

Fake Santa Claus/Animal Control
Fake Santa Claus/Animal Control (voiced by Bobby Moynihan) - Not the real Santa Claus but has the power to mind control animals and humans. He locked up the real Santa Claus and forced everyone at the North Pole to work for him then he used his small amount of control over humans to make parents tell their kids that their Christmas presents came from him and waited 80 years until kids all over the world admired him and would give him their complete loyalty then tried to take over the world. He was then betrayed by Rudolph (whom everyone regards as a total dick) and was "killed" by the Awesomes. He woke up in a hospital where Malocchio Jr. has fixed him up and made him a new robotic body (which he resents). Fake Santa Claus later joined the P.R.I.C.K.S so he can take revenge on the Awesomes for destroying his body and ruining his plan of taking over the world with kids. Although he was soundly defeated in their final battle, Prock didn't wish to "kill" Santa twice, so he used his medical know-how to graft Animal Control's head onto the body of a giant slug-like alien.

The Replacement Awesomes
After Prock's team is kicked off the Awesomes after the city is in ruins, Mr. Awesome (who has turned evil and caused the carnage in secret) takes over with Perfect Man and enlists a new team. They are apparently older members of the Awesomes, but all is not what it seems.

Frank "Mr. Awesome" Awesome
Frank "Mr. Awesome" Awesome (voiced by Steve Higgins) - The founder of the original Awesomes and its leader for the past 60 years, and Prock and Perfect Man's father. Although his powers slow his aging, he announced on his 90th birthday that he was retiring (to outer space, so that he wouldn't be bothered). He wanted Perfect Man to take over - "the son I never had" - but his actual son Prock volunteered when Perfect Man turned down the offer. Mr. Awesome thinks Prock will never be a superhero because he doesn't have any powers (Prock told his dad that he doesn't use his Time ability anymore). Mr. Awesome's powers are similar to Superman's: superhuman strength, speed, flight, super breath, laser vision, and invulnerability. He wears a red, white, and blue outfit with a red cape and a 100-ton metal "A" on his crest. In the season two finale, a mishap during a transfusion of his blood into Giuseppe Malocchio caused him to be accidentally exposed to the evil super-gene, radically altering his personality. In season 3, he had disbanded Prock's team of Awesomes and is currently running for President of the U.S. as a part of his evil plan to destroy all of humanity. He was well ahead in the polls but that fell apart after a disastrous debate at the town hall for insulting the general public so he made Prock his campaign manager to help him get back in the lead and retrieve evidence that may end his candidacy which reveals he has an illegitimate son who was revealed to be Perfect Man. In the season 3 finale, he finally returns to being good again after Prock injected the antidote in him after he thought he killed Perfect Man.

Pharaoh
Pharaoh (voiced by David Herman) - An Egyptian themed hero that wears a mask similar to King Tut. Perfect Man incorrectly calls him the Mummy. He wields a staff that can create snakes out of energy.

Hotwings
Hotwings (voiced by Bobby Moynihan) - A rooster themed hero with buck teeth and a Southern Accent, Perfect Man constantly gets his name wrong (including calling him Pigeon Something and Pigeon Guy). Has the ability to breathe fire.

Silent But Deadly
Silent But Deadly (voiced by Leslie Jones) - A mute ninja hero in all black with teleportation powers. Despite Perfect Man's concerns that Silent But Deadly watches him in his sleep, she's the only seen member of this team who Perfect Man can relate to and doesn't act like a jerk. Nicknamed SBD by Perfect Man. She may not be loyal to Mr. Awesome, as she saved Hotwire's life when the team was ordered to kill her. In season 3 finale, he is revealed to a 47-year old black woman and starts dating Perfect Man.

Rocket Boobs
Rocket Boobs (voiced by Michelle Wolf) - An African-American woman who looks very similar to RoboCop (metallic body) and Anton Zeck (tech bodysuit with mohawk and visor). Speaks with a valley girl accent and has cybernetic tentacles in her boobs. In the episode "Super(hero) Tuesday" she mentions that Perfect Man referred to her as Rocket Boobs but he may have only been describing what he was seeing, implying that "Rocket Boobs" may be her actual name but Perfect man only guessed it by accident.

Centaur
Centaur (voiced by Fred Armisen) - A centaur who make horse puns and gets slapped on the butt by Mr. Awesome to get rid of him. Wields a sword. He is not very bright and self-conscious about his body.

Codebraker
Codebraker (voiced by Charlie Adler) - The team's computer expert and hacker.

Unnamed Member
Unnamed Member - Perfect Man mentions a hero who can make ice cubes (perfect for margaritas) who has never been seen.

Dames of Danger
A female black ops team made up of solely superheroines who teamed up with Gadget Gal, Concierge and Hotwire against Backstory. Their base is any female bathroom and they receive their instruction from Mr. Danger (who is later fired, then arrested for taking secret pictures of the Dames in the bathroom using his hidden cameras (the disturbing implications of which are often brought up), later replaced with an African-American man named Calvin Anderson.

Joyce "Fireplug" Mandrake
Joyce "Fireplug" Mandrake (voiced by Rachel Dratch) - She's from the G.O.O.S.A. (Government Office of Superhero Affairs) and she handles the funding for the Awesomes. Since the original team disbanded, the government has been threatening to pull the Awesomes' funding. Prock is constantly trying to get it permanently restored, but Joyce won't make it easy on him. Joyce often walks into Awesome mountain unannounced due to the fact that they don't lock the tower. She has also been shown to be rather incompetent, such as when Dr. Malocchio escaped prison she seemed more concerned with shutting down the Awesomes than catching Malocchio, showed no signs of trying to arrest him or prove that he was lying to the public and when he broke into her office she failed to call security. In episode 6 of season 3 (Dames of Danger) she is revealed to have the power to become an unstoppable human battering ram and is also highly sexually aggressive. In "The Gayfather", it is revealed that she knew Perfect Man was Mr. Awesome's son and Prock's half brother since he was a child. In the season 3 finale, she became the first female president of the United States after the old one resigned.

Glinda "Lady Malocchio" Malocchio
Glinda "Lady Malocchio" Malocchio (voiced by Maya Rudolph) - The supportive, carefree, slightly absent-minded wife of Dr. Malocchio and mother of Malocchio Jr. and Hotwire. Despite her son becoming a supervillain, she gives him her messenger bag, that allow its wearer to fly, and remains supportive and caring. After Malocchio Jr's incarceration, she re-acquired her messenger bag and joins the Dames of Danger, though she has a hard time keeping her membership a secret. She also has telekinetic powers.

Jaclyn Stone
Jaclyn Stone (voiced by Amy Poehler) - Was originally Prock's girlfriend whom he started dating in "The People vs Perfect Man". When Malocchio Jr. needed someone passionate to motivate the rest of the P.R.I.C.K.S. in "Euro-Awesomes", he slid an envelope containing photos of Prock being kissed by two different women on different occasions under her door.  When seeing the photos, she went into a psychotic rage, trashed her office, broke up with Prock and accepted the offer to join the P.R.I.C.K.S. After joining the P.R.I.C.K.S. she demonstrated enough strength to pick up a large metal table and throw it through a wall despite not being given any of Malocchio's super serum. She admits she can be very focused when angry. Prock calmed Jaclyn with a long, boring story, defusing her jealous rage and turning her righteous anger on Malocchio Jr. She is the only person to join the P.R.I.C.K.S. to not be the main villain of an episode. She later joins the Dames of Danger, using her anger-fueled super strength in combat.

Abby "Musclegirl" Strong-Apelstein
Abby "Musclegirl" Strong-Apelstein (voiced by Jill Benjamin) - Muscleman's sister who was first introduced in the season 2 episode 'Destination Deading', where she married an ape. Like the rest of her family, she has super strength. Also, despite being happily married, she has an obsessive stalker-like crush on Prock.

Others with superpowers

Dine and Dash
Dine and Dash (voiced by Cecily Strong and Mike O'Gorman) - Sumo's parents, two former mercenaries who formed their own criminal duo after meeting in combat and falling in love. After Tim was conceived, they settled down to a quiet life as a real estate agent and a CPA, posing as Japanese immigrants with heavy accents. (In fact, Tim's father is third-generation Japanese-American and his mother is Korean-American.) When the time comes for them to change their identities again, they try to take Tim with them, but he manages to stay with The Awesomes.

Kid Crab
Kid Crab (voiced by Andy Samberg) - One of the heroes who auditioned for the Awesomes. He has the ability to regenerate limbs, which he demonstrated by slicing his arm off, much to the horror of the Awesomes.

The Advocate
The Advocate (voiced by Tina Fey) - One of the heroes who auditions for the Awesomes. She has the ability to turn anyone temporarily gay and wears a costume designed with a rainbow belt. Under her powers, Concierge found her "interesting," but Prock turned her down in a flamboyant and melodramatic way.

Toolbox
Toolbox (voiced by Bobby Moynihan) - One of the heroes who auditioned for the Awesomes. He wears a Toolbox as a costume  and a hammer helmet and has several different screwdrivers for fingers, but was turned down for being bored.

The Snotzi
The Snotzi - One of the heroes who auditioned for the Awesomes. He speaks with a heavy German accent and dresses as a Nazi. He has the ability to shoot acid snot. Prock though immediately rejected him because of his name, but Muscleman thought he would be fun to hang out with.

Teleportation Larry
Teleportation Larry (voiced by Bobby Moynihan) - When Muscleman quits the team, Teleportation Larry joins The Awesomes in his place.  He has the power to teleport himself and others as long as he can see them.  He is an active alcoholic but saves the day at the end of season one when he teleports the team away from Malocchio's control.  He also saves Hotwire before the big explosion in the White House, although Prock and the team think she is dead.

Black Irish
Black Irish (voiced by Taran Killam) - A former member of The Awesomes in the glory days of the team, Black Irish is masked crime fighter and the world's greatest detective.  He helps Prock deduce who the traitor on the team is.  He speaks with a gruff voice until it annoys Impresario so much that he gives him a lozenge.

California Man
California Man - A former superhero who was responsible for the deaths of 600 people when he flew to San Francisco instead of Sacramento, due to the fact that he did not know the capital of California. In response to this, the President signed into law the Underage Superhero Education Act, declaring that "any superhero of school age must be enrolled in school and maintain a B average".

Cait Walker
Cait Walker (voiced by Noël Wells) - Tim's classmate at Spiro Agnew Middle School who was the first to befriend him and showed him around. She also is a superhero with the powers to blow pink bubbles and entrapping object they touch. She kept her powers a secret until Tim was humiliated by some school bullies causing him to rage out of control and attack everyone in sight as Sumo. She prevented the police from shooting him and calmed him down.

Made Man
Made Man (voiced by Bobby Moynihan) - A former superhero from the 70s who can perform gang-like punishments, such as kneecapping people or tying them to a chain connected to a cement block. In the present day, he is shown as a good friend of Gadget Gal, as they are shown among their other friends playing poker. He eventually enters a sexual relationship with Impresario's mother, which caused one of Imp's constructs of himself to have both Made Man and Ms. Sullivan having sex on his shoulder. Made Man also tried to get Perfect Man a new identity in Italy, which failed when Perfect Man returned thinking that Made Man would give him another identity somewhere else exotic.

Euro-Awesomes
A European version of the Awesomes. They have the name because when Mr. Awesome founded the team he forgot to secure international naming rights. Each member represents a different European country. They first appear in the episode "Euro-Awesomes".

Knight Light
Knight Light - (voiced by Noël Wells) Represents England. Has a lot in common with Prock, both being the team lead and falling a bit short in the powers department. Her powers (if she has any) are unknown, though her name indicates that they might be low level light powers, possibly the power to glow.

Flying Dutchman
Flying Dutchman - (voiced by Josh Meyers) Represents the Netherlands. He has windmill fans on his back that allow him to fly, it is unknown if these are actually part of him or just a mechanism. Shares his name with a train, and a legendary ghost ship.

Crotch Puncher
Crotch Puncher (voiced by Bobby Moynihan) - Represents Spain. He is dressed like a bullfighter and has a giant left hand. Like his name suggests, he only punches people in the groin because, according to him, any animal can punch in the face or body, but it takes skill and precision to punch in the groin every single time.

Hooligan
Hooligan (voiced by Taran Killam) - Represents Ireland. Is both strong and rude. Muscleman considers him to be the European version of himself. His superpower has been shown to have some association with spitting acid and somewhat superhuman strength.

Mademoiselle Hunchback
Mademoiselle Hunchback (voiced by Kate McKinnon) - Represent France. Can transform from a beautiful women into a hideous hunchback (though it is unknown if this grants any extra strength or durability) and fights with a Gatling gun. Impresario had a crush on her and gave her gifts of affection. She claimed to despise him (though she admitted she likes the shoes he gave her) but at the end of the episode she admitted she liked him, too and agreed to have sex four times with him and have one awkward phone call. Hunchback can be shown to be relatively selfish and constantly has Impresario spend tons of money for her. After her home country France is destroyed, she is currently living in Awesome Mountain. But in season 3, she moves back to Paris after Perfect Man rebuilt it.

Invisi-Pope
Invisi-Pope - Represents both Italy and the Catholic church. Despite his power being invisibility, he wears visible clothes rendering his power useless.

Czechmate
Czechmate (voiced by Ike Barinholtz) - Represents the Czech Republic. Name is pronounced Checkmate. Can change between any chess piece (though only the castle and knight have been seen so far) and fights with a sword. May be a robot.

Non-Powered Humans

Annabelle Sullivan
Annabelle Sullivan (also voiced by Kenan Thompson) - Impresario's mother who smothered him and prevented him from pursuing any sports or hobbies as a child. She now is living with and dating Made Man.

Dr. Jill Stein-Awesome-Kaplan
Dr. Jill Stein-Awesome-Kaplan (voiced by Vanessa Bayer) - Prock's mother, Mr. Awesome's ex-wife and one of the world's foremost anti-superhero activists. Despite having helped to pass The Superhero Regulation Act in 1972 and repeatedly insulting or discrediting anyone who is or wants to be a superhero, she loves her son, gives the Awesomes a place to live after they are kicked out of Awesome Mountain, and still holds a flame for Mr. Awesome.

Dr. Jeffry Kaplan
Dr. Jeffry Kaplan (voiced by Fred Armisen) - Jill's current husband and Prock's stepfather who is an accredited therapist. An overly optimistic and friendly person, he is a pushover who won't talk after his wife (or anyone) says "Jeffry enough".

Steven
Steven (voiced by Dan Mintz) - Frantic's ex-boyfriend, who only appears in "The Awesomes' Awesome Show." Not much was known about him, but as of "The GayFather," he has broken up with Frantic, much to the latter's sadness.

Awesomes